Lars Glasser (4 October 1925 – 15 January 1999) was a Swedish sprint canoeist who competed in the late 1940s and early 1950s. He won the silver medal in the K-2 1000 m event at the 1952 Summer Olympics in Helsinki.

Glasser also won six medals at the ICF Canoe Sprint World Championships with five golds (K-1 4 x 500 m: 1948, 1950, 1954; K-2 500 m: 1950, K-2 1000 m: 1950) and one silver (K-1 500 m: 1948). Note that the K-1 500 m, K-1 4 x 500 m, and K-2 500 m events were part of the International Canoe Federation's 1948 World Championships and not of the 1948 Summer Olympics, which was also in London. The K-1 4 x 500 m event was held at the Summer Olympics once at the 1960 Games in Rome while the K-1 500 m and K-2 500 m have been held at every Olympics since the 1976 Games in Montreal.

References

1925 births
1999 deaths
Canoeists at the 1952 Summer Olympics
Olympic canoeists of Sweden
Olympic silver medalists for Sweden
Swedish male canoeists
Olympic medalists in canoeing
ICF Canoe Sprint World Championships medalists in kayak
Medalists at the 1952 Summer Olympics
20th-century Swedish people